Jillian McDonald is a conceptual artist and curator from Canada, living in Brooklyn, New York. Her work is meant to be humorous and features references to popular films. She uses video art, net art, performance art, installations, and photography.

Her interests are the American celebrity culture, extreme fandom, themes and characters from horror films. In her best-known works she digitally manipulated romantic scenes from Hollywood films starring actors such as Billy Bob Thornton, Vincent Gallo, and Johnny Depp, investigating celebrity obsession. In The Screaming, she inserted herself into horror films such as The Shining and Alien, screaming at the monsters to scare them away or destroy them. In Horror Makeup, she applies makeup on a subway commute, turning herself into a zombie.

Exhibitions 
Her 2013 Valley of the Deer installation features a 3-channel video, augmented reality, and drawings created during the Glenfiddich International Artist Residency. It stars residents of Dufftown and other Northern Scottish towns.

 Centre Clark, "Valley of the Deer", Montreal, Canada (2015)
 UWAG, University of Waterloo Art Gallery, "Valley of the Deer", Waterloo, Canada (2015)
 Esker Foundation, "Valley of the Deer", Calgary, Canada (2013)
 Hallwalls, ‘’RedRum", Buffalo, NY (2010) 
 Arizona State University Museum, "Alone Together in the Dark", Tempe, AZ (2009 - 2010)
 Lilith Performance Studio, "Undead in the Night", Malmo, Sweden (2009)

References

External links 
Official website
 Feature article in The New York Times by Carol Kino
Radio documentary, Valley of the Deer, by Paul Kennedy on CBC's Ideas
Interview on WPS1 Radio by Daniel Durning
The Transatlantic Zombie by Sarah J. Lauro
Deconstructung Brad Pitt, ed. by Christopher Schaberg and Robert Bennett
Getting to Know Zombies by Kristen Hutchinson for Hyperallergic

Canadian performance artists
Women performance artists
Canadian video artists
Women video artists
Artists from Winnipeg
Canadian women artists
Living people
Canadian expatriates in the United States
Year of birth missing (living people)